The National Motor Museum, formerly also known as The Old Mill and Birdwood Mill after its initial location, is an automobile museum in the Adelaide Hills in the township of Birdwood, South Australia.

History
The museum was started by Jack Kaines and Len Vigar in 1964, and, as the Birdwood Mill Pioneer, Art and Motor Museum, sold to a private company led by Gavin Sandford-Morgan in 1970. It was purchased by the South Australian Government in 1976, and from 1982 came under the auspices of History SA.

In 1980 the Federation of Vintage Car Clubs (SA) approached Donald Chisholm , then general manager of the museum, to participate in the inaugural Bay to Birdwood classic car run. Chisholm agreed to be co-organiser, and suggested and agreed to provide a perpetual trophy for the "Concours d'Elegance", with its design based on the Shearer Steam Car, which would remain on display at (as it was then often called) Birdwood Mill.

Description and uses
The National Motor Museum is Australia's largest motor museum, with close to 400 vehicles on display . It holds a large and historically important collection of cars, motorcycles and commercial vehicles. It is housed in a modern complex adjacent to its original home, "The Old Mill" on Shannon Street, Birdwood.

The museum is the endpoint of the annual Bay to Birdwood run, in which vintage, veteran and classic cars and other road vehicles are driven by their owners from the foreshore area of Adelaide through to the Adelaide Hills to finish at the museum, where a festival is held and trophies awarded.

Exhibits
The following is a non-exhaustive list of motor vehicles on display:
1897 Peugeot Type 17 chassis
1899 Shearer Steam Carriage
1900 De Dion-Bouton Type E Vis-à-vis
1904 Ohlmeyer 'Jigger' Tourer 
1907 Rover 6hp
1908 Talbot
1909 Merryweather Fire Engine
1910 Daimler Landaulette
1913 Newton Bennett 12 hp Tourer
1913 Renault Two Seater
1914 Dixi R12 Tourer
1919 Lincoln Six Tourer
1920 Palm Tourer
1921 Ford Model T
1924 Summit Tourer
1925 Straker Squire 
1925 Rolls-Royce 20 hp coupe with Carrosserie Vanvooren body
1925 Hudson Super Six Phaeton
1926 Graham Brothers truck
1926 Garford flat top truck
1927 Packard 5.26 sedan
1928 Erskine Model 50 Coupe
1928 Dodge Series 128 'Fast Four'
1928 Ford Model A Tourer
1929 Essex Challenger sedan
1929 Austin 7 Tourer
1934 Ford V8 coupe utility (unrestored)
1935 Chevrolet delivery van
1936 Dodge LE 30 Drapers van
1936 Leyland Badger
1937 Chevrolet Standard sedan
1937 Morris 8/40 Series II sedan 
1939 Willys Overland Model 77 sedan 
1939 Diamond T Bus
1941 Ford One Tonne Utility 
1948 Chevrolet Stylemaster
1948 Hartnett prototype
1949 Hillman Minx
1952 Vanguard Overland custom rebodied off-roader
1952 Edith 197cc Villiers (unrestored shell)
1956 Land Rover Series 1 LWB Station Wagon (one of two driven by the Leyland brothers in the film Wheels Across a Wilderness)
1956 Rover Model 75
1958 Holden FC Special Station Sedan
1958 Land Rover Series 1 short wheelbase off-roader
1959 Chevrolet Bel Air sedan
1959 Chrysler Royal AP2
1961 Toyota Tiara RT20 sedan
1962 Ford Anglia 105E
1963 Zeta Runabout
1963 Lightburn Zeta Sports
1963 Lightburn Station sedan
1965 Zeta Sports
1966 Ford Falcon 500 sedan
1968 Holden Brougham
1969 Holden Panel Van 'Midnight Express' 
1971 Chrysler Valiant Charger R/T38 coupe racer
1972 Kenworth W902 truck
1974 Holden Kingswood
1974 Datsun 260Z
1974 Holden Torana supercharged drag car
1976 Holden Sandman
1976 Datsun 120Y sedan
1976 Rover 3500 P6B
1977 Holden Torana A9X hatchback
1977 Leyland Mini Moke
1978 Leyland Mini 1275 LS
1978 Leyland Mini panel van
1980 HDT Commodore Brock Group A
1980 Telecom Australia Phone Car
1982 Mitsubishi L300 people mover van
1983 Mitsubishi Magna sedan prototype
1983 Toyota Land Cruiser FJ45 wagon
1986 Holden Piazza Turbo coupe
1991 Holden Caprice
1996 Mitsubishi Verada wagon test mule
1998 Toyota Prius sedan
2000 Chevrolet Lumina sedan (based on Holden Commodore)
2000 Holden ECOmmodore sedan (VX) concept car
2000 Toyota WiLL Vi
2004 Pontiac GTO (based on Holden Monaro)
2008 Mitsubishi 380 Series III Premier sedan

The following is a non-exhaustive list of motorbikes display:
1904 Minerva
1910 Matchless
1918 Favourite 
1920 Harley Davidson Sport Twin
1923 Matchless H-2 with side chair
1923 Waratah 
1927 Indian Scout
1930 BSA S30
1936 Brough-Superior Model SS80
1948 Vincent Series B Rapide
1949 Velocette Mk8 KTT
1960 Mazda Three Wheeler
1964 Honda Monkey CZ100
1966 BMW R60/2
1969 Benelli 250cc racer
1972 Honda CB 750
1981 Kawasaki KLX250B
1983 KMZ Dnepr Custom Cruzer replica

See also
List of automobile museums

References

External links

Driven Media: Birdwood National Motor Museum – recorded interview with Marianne Norman, Director of the Museum
National Motor Museum – official site

Adelaide Hills
Automobile museums in Australia
Museums in South Australia
1964 establishments in Australia
Museums established in 1964
History museums in Australia